Richard Broughton may refer to:
Richard Broughton (priest) (c. 1558–1634), English Catholic priest and antiquarian
Richard Broughton (MP) (1524–1604), English politician
Richard Broughton, president of Society for Psychical Research
Richard Broughton of Colaba, India